Ilarion Hrabovych (June 18, 1856, Shmankivtsi, now Chortkiv Raion, Ternopil Oblast - July 11/24, 1903, Lviv) - Ukrainian poet, literary figure, publicist, teacher.

Biography
He was born on June 18, 1856, in the family of a teacher in the village of Shmankivtsi (Chortkiv district, Kingdom of Galicia and Lodomeria, Austrian Empire, now Chortkiv Raion, Ternopil Oblast, Ukraine). He graduated from the Faculty of Philosophy in 1884, Lviv University, a teacher by profession. He taught in high schools in Buchach, Sambor, Lviv. He died, according to some sources, 11 (according to others, July 24) in 1903 in Lviv (Kingdom of Galicia and Vladimir, Austria-Hungary, now Lviv region, Ukraine). Buried on the 31st floor of Lychakiv Cemetery, the grave is not preserved.

Legacy

He began writing in the mid-1870s. Author of a short historical novel, essays, poetry. Employee of Zorya, Dila, Svita, and other magazines.

The most famous works:
 "Marta Boretska" (novel, 1880, adaptation of N. Karamzin's novel "Martha Posadnytsia, or the conquest of Novgorod"),
 "A Brief History of Novgorod" (1880),
 "The Best Easter" (autobiographical story, 1882),
 "The Cursed Dungeon",
 "Choice of Poetry" (collection of poems; Lviv, 1905).

References

Sources
 Легка О. Грабович Іляріон (Ілярій, Іларіон) Михайлович // Франківська енциклопедія : у 7 т. / редкол.: М. Жулинський, Є. Нахлік, А. Швець та ін. — Львів : Світ, 2016. — Т. 1 : А — Ж / наук. ред. і упоряд. Є. Нахлік; передмова М. Жулинський, Є. Нахлік. — С. 427–428. — ISBN 978-966-914-034-0.
 Пиндус Б., Ткачов С. Грабович Іларіон Михайлович // Тернопільський енциклопедичний словник : у 4 т. / редкол.: Г. Яворський та ін. — Тернопіль : Видавничо-поліграфічний комбінат «Збруч», 2004. — Т. 1 : А — Й. — С. 409. — ISBN 966-528-197-6.
 Струни. Т. 2. — 1922.

Shmankivtsi

Ukrainian poets
1856 births
1903 deaths